Citigroup Centre is a  skyscraper located on Park Street, Sydney, New South Wales, Australia. The building draws its name from Citigroup Australia who is the anchor tenant.

The building is one of the tallest buildings in Australia, however upon completion in 2000 it was the 8th tallest. Citigroup Centre is also the second-tallest building in the city when measured to its spire. The architect was Crone and Associates.

The building has 41 levels of office space, 5 levels of underground parking and four levels of commercial space known as "The Galeries". An underground retail arcade connects the lower ground floor to Town Hall station and the  Queen Victoria Building.

The building is jointly owned and managed by the Charter Hall and GPT Group.

See also

 List of tallest buildings in Sydney
 List of tallest buildings in Australia

References

External links

 Official Citigroup Centre Sydney Site
 Citigroup Centre on Emporis.com (General database of skyscrapers)
 Citigroup Centre on SkyscraperPage (Pictures and diagrams of skyscrapers)

Skyscrapers in Sydney
Citigroup buildings
Office buildings completed in 2000
Office buildings in Sydney
Skyscraper office buildings in Australia
Retail buildings in New South Wales
Bank buildings in New South Wales
Sydney central business district